Maulana Bhasani Hockey Stadium is a field hockey stadium located in Dhaka, Bangladesh. It is the first hockey stadium in Bangladesh and also the headquarters of Bangladesh Hockey Federation.

References 

Sports venues in Dhaka
Field hockey in Bangladesh